Mourilyan Harbour is a coastal locality and harbour within the Cassowary Coast Region, Queensland, Australia.

Geography
The locality of Mourilyan Harbour is a coastal area bounded by the Coral Sea on the east and the Moresby River and one of its tributary creeks to the south. Apart from the port facility on the Moresby River, most of the locality is farmland or undeveloped land. The Mourilyan Harbour Road runs roughly east–west through the locality linking the port to the town of Mourilyan.

History

He named it after one of his officers, Lieutenant T. L. Mourilyan.

In the 2011 census, the population of Mourilyan Harbour was not separately reported but was included in the population for neighbouring New Harbourline with a combined population of 317 people.

Port facility
The port is used for the export of sugar and molasses from Innisfail, Babinda, Tully and the Atherton Tableland. Woodchips and logs are also exported through the port.

Recreation
Mourilyan Harbour is known for its recreational fishing with many creeks and channels, lined with mangroves. Fish caught there include barramundi, mangrove jacks, giant trevally and queenfish. However, caution must be taken during windy weather as the water can become very choppy.

See also
 List of tramways in Queensland

References

External links

  — also covers Mourilyan Harbour

Cassowary Coast Region
Ports and harbours of Queensland
Ports and harbors of the Pacific Ocean
Localities in Queensland